Māhoenui is a small community in the western North Island of New Zealand, on the Awakino River, near Piopio and Te Kuiti.

History
The Croall family lived on the Awakino River in the 1920s and 1930s, eventually having to leave the land as uneconomic to survive by traditional farming methods. Charles Croall, sr., relocated to Hamilton, setting up a construction business (Croall Construction) to build houses en-masse for the government. These subdivisions became known as 'State house areas' and were typically inhabited by lower socio-economic communities. Large numbers of those houses have been sold to private buyers, both individually and in bulk. 

Lewis Robert Ridling (commonly known as Bob) and his wife Margaret Marina Ridling née Jackson along with their 5 sons and 3 daughters cleared the land by hand of scrub and bush in this area. The Ridlings worked their Māhoenui farm from the 1920s onward after Bob Ridling won the land in a returned veterans ballot after returning wounded from Gallipoli, Turkey from World War I. Many ex servicemen simply walked off the land due to the difficulty of turning it into viable farm land. The Moss's were also well known in the area as Mr Moss was the local school teacher in the 1930s. 

Māhoenui is in meshblocks 1016005, 1016101-2, and 1016203-4, which had a population of 78 people in the 2018 census.

Education
Until 2005, Māhoenui had a small primary school, with a roll of six children in 2004. In 2005, the school closed down due to lack of students, with the property now privately owned.

Geography

Economics
The primary activity is sheep farming, with beef and dairy farming to a lesser degree.

References

External links
Map of Māhoenui area
Croall and Moss Family memorial site
Mahoenui School
Map and demographic data source for New Zealand

Populated places in Waikato
Waitomo District